Jonathan Richard McDaniel (born May 17, 1985), better known by his stage name Lil J, is an American actor and rapper.  He is best known for his role as Devon Carter (Raven Baxter's boyfriend, and later ex-husband) on the hit Disney Channel shows That's So Raven and Raven's Home, as well as German Vega on BET's Hit the Floor.

Career
In 2002, he came on the music scene with his debut single "It's the Weekend" from his debut album All About J. He later released a follow-up album the next year titled Back 2 J, which featured the single "Baby Girl".

During this period, he started his acting career, landing his noteworthy role on the Disney Channel series That's So Raven. He also appeared in the film Nora's Hair Salon which starred Jenifer Lewis and Tatyana Ali in 2004. After the release of his studio albums on Hollywood Records, he left and joined 845 Entertainment/SMC Recordings, releasing his third album Back Like I Left Somethin''' in 2006.

McDaniel signed with London-based record label Transmission Records in 2009 and released his digital single 'London Girl' on May 16, 2010. In 2012, McDaniel starred in In the Hive to much acclaim. The film was shot in only 18 days. In 2013, he joined the cast of BET's new series Hit the Floor.

In 2017, McDaniel reprised his role as Devon Carter on the revamp of Disney Channel's That's So Raven, titled Raven's Home''.  He appears as the ex-husband of Raven-Symoné's character Raven Baxter, with whom Devon shares twins Nia and Booker.

Personal life 
McDaniel has a daughter, Aiza Jae McDaniel, born on August 21, 2013.

On July 30, 2017, McDaniel's son, Asher Levi, was born.

Filmography

Film

Television

Web

Discography

Albums

Singles

References

External links
Official Website

1985 births
African-American male actors
African-American rappers
American male child actors
American male television actors
Living people
Musicians from Long Beach, California
21st-century American rappers
21st-century American male actors
21st-century African-American musicians
20th-century African-American people